Amendment 1 of 2004 is an amendment to the Mississippi Constitution that prohibited same-sex marriages from being conducted or recognized in Mississippi.  The Amendment passed a public referendum on November 2, 2004 with 86% of voters supporting and 14% opposing.

When compared to all similar amendments passed in the United States, Mississippi Amendment 1 had the highest percentage of votes for the amendment, outpacing the next two states, Alabama and Tennessee, at 81%.

Contents
The text of the adopted amendment, which is found at Article XIV, section 263A of the Mississippi Constitution, states:

Results

Results by county

See also
LGBT rights in Mississippi

References

External links
 The Money Behind the 2004 Marriage Amendments -- National Institute on Money in State Politics

U.S. state constitutional amendments banning same-sex unions
2004 in LGBT history
LGBT in Mississippi
2004 Mississippi elections
2004 ballot measures
Mississippi ballot measures
Same-sex marriage ballot measures in the United States